In category theory, a branch of mathematics, a pulation square (also called a Doolittle diagram) is a diagram that is simultaneously a pullback square and a pushout square. It is a self-dual concept.

References 
 Adámek, Jiří, Herrlich, Horst, & Strecker, George E. (1990). Abstract and Concrete Categories (4.2MB PDF). Originally publ. John Wiley & Sons. . (now free on-line edition)
Herrlich, Horst, & Strecker, George E., Category Theory, Heldermann Verlag (2007).

Category theory